Robert Clinton Bast Jr., (born December 8, 1943) is an American physician-scientist who is currently Vice President for Translational Research at the University of Texas M.D. Anderson Cancer Center. Bast is best known for the discovery of CA125, a serum biomarker for ovarian cancer that has contributed to the care of ovarian cancer patients worldwide. His research spans early detection, enhancing chemotherapy and understanding regulation of dormancy and the role of autophagy in breast and ovarian cancer.

References

1943 births
Wesleyan University alumni
University of Texas MD Anderson Cancer Center faculty
Harvard Medical School alumni
Living people